Potrace is a cross-platform, open-source software which converts bitmapped images into vector graphics. It is written and maintained by Peter Selinger.

Properties 
Various graphical frontends are available for the command-line application Potrace. Notably, it has been integrated with Inkscape, giving Inkscape its Trace Bitmap action. FontForge can use Potrace to import a bitmap image into a font. Potrace is also used by the music engraving program LilyPond. An open-source progressive web app that uses Potrace is SVGcode.

Potrace's input and output is black and white (colored images are greyscaled before processing). However, Inkscape is capable of producing color images by decomposing each channel into several black and white images and tracing them separately with Potrace. The commercial Total Vectorize program also uses Potrace as its core.

The program is dual-licensed as "Potrace" under the GPL and as "Potrace Professional" in a proprietary license by Selinger's company, Icosasoft Software, Inc.

Examples

See also

 Comparison of raster-to-vector conversion software

References

Further reading
 Peter Selinger, Potrace: a polygon-based tracing algorithm, Sep 2003
  Elisa de Castro Guerra, Inkscape: Apprenez, pratiquez, créez, Pearson Education France, 2007, pp. 108–111
 Yannis Haralambous, Fonts & encodings, O'Reilly Media, Inc., 2007, pp. 500–501
 Karel Píška, Creating Type 1 Fonts from METAFONT Sources: Comparison of Tools, Techniques and Results in TeX, XML, and digital typography: International Conference on TeX, XML, and Digital Typography, held jointly with the 25th Annual Meeting of the TeX Users Group, TUG 2004, Xanthi, Greece, August 30 - September 3, 2004 ; proceedings, LNCS Volume 3130, Editor Apostolos Syropoulos, Springer, 2004, pp. 240–256, preprint

External links
  on SourceForge
 Vince Vatter, How to make slides from handwritten notes using potrace
 Online version of Potrace ported with WebAssembly

Free raster to vector conversion software
Free software programmed in C